Protocreopsis is a genus of fungi in the class Sordariomycetes. It consists of nine species.

References

Hypocreales genera
Bionectriaceae
Taxa described in 1977